Stomias affinis, also known as Gunther's boafish, is a deep-sea mesopelagic fish species in the family Stomiidae. They inhabit the open seas in the equatorial zones of the Atlantic, Indian and Pacific Oceans.

Description
Stomias affinis is an elongated, slender, barbeled dragonfish and is a sexually dimorphic species. It has a short  barbel on its chin and a few illuminated photophores between its lateral and ventral rows. The fish's stomach is caramel in color with white spots and constitutes seventy-five percent of the total body length.

Distribution and habitat
Stomias affinis geographic findings include the Arabian Sea, Celebes Sea, the Gulf of Aden, Socotra, the Somali coast and the South China Sea. They share the same habitat area as Stomias nebuloses and are not suited for living in a low-oxygen environment. They inhabit deeper water during the day and are found above 150m during the night.

Diet
Diet consists of mostly myctophid fishes including the Diaphus genus and other small unidentified fish as well as decapods. It is estimated that at least one myctophid is eaten every twelve days.

References

Stomiidae
Fish described in 1887
Taxa named by Albert Günther